This is the list of modern Hangul characters in ISO/IEC 2022–compliant national character set standards.

 South Korea (KR): KS X 1001 (formerly KS C 5601) and KS X 1002 (formerly KS C 5657)
 North Korea (KP): KPS 9566
 China (CN): GB 12052

Note: In the tables below, the "KPS 9566" column excludes Hangul characters that are not in the EUC range ([\xA1-\xFE][\xA1-\xFE]) and the duplicate syllables for the names of the former and current leaders of North Korea.

Jamo (consonants and vowels) 

51 characters in total.

Note: KS X 1002 is a supplementary character set for KS X 1001. As all modern Hangul jamo characters are already in KS X 1001, none are in KS X 1002.

Syllables 

 KS X 1001: 2,350 characters
 KS X 1002: 1,930 characters
 KPS 9566: 2,679 characters
 GB 12052: 3,373 characters (2,017 in rows 16–37 and 1,356 in rows 38–52)
 Union of the above: 4,300 characters

Notes:
 For the "Count (KR)" and "Count (KP & CN)" columns, see Hangul#Alphabetic order.
 In the "" column, the "∅" character denotes the empty final.

References 

Hangul